The 2017–18 Southeastern Louisiana Lions basketball team represented Southeastern Louisiana University during the 2017–18 NCAA Division I men's basketball season. The Lions, led by fourth-year head coach Jay Ladner, played their home games at the University Center in Hammond, Louisiana  as members of the Southland Conference. They finished the season 22–12, 15–3 in Southland play to finish in a tie for the Southland regular season championship with Nicholls State. As the No. 1 seed in the Southland tournament, they defeated Sam Houston State in the semifinals before losing in the championship game to Stephen F. Austin. As a regular season champion, and No. 1 seed in their conference tournament, who failed to win their conference tournament, they received an automatic bid to the National Invitation Tournament where they lost in the first round to Saint Mary's.

Previous season
The Lions finished the 2016–17 season 16–16, 9–9 in Southland play to finish in seventh place. They lost in the first round of the Southland tournament to Lamar.

Roster

Schedule and results

|-
!colspan=9 style=| Exhibition

|-
!colspan=9 style=| Non-conference regular season

|-
!colspan=9 style=|Southland regular season

|-
!colspan=9 style=| Southland tournament

|-
!colspan=9 style=| NIT

See also
2017–18 Southeastern Louisiana Lady Lions basketball team

References

Southeastern Louisiana Lions basketball seasons
Southeastern Louisiana
Southeastern Louisiana Lions basketball
Southeastern Louisiana Lions basketball
Southeastern Louisiana